Chis or CHIS may refer to:

 Chis, France, a commune in France
 Chi, plural chis
 Chi Alpha Delta, or Chis, an American sorority
 Covert human intelligence source, or CHIS
 Chiș, Romanian surname, people with the name include:
 Cătălin Chiș (born 1988), football player
  (born 1950), politician
  (1913-1981), mathematician and astronomer

See also 
 Chis and Sid, an English grammar school